Donets is a river on the south of the East European Plain, known between locals as Siverskyi Donets or Severskiy Donets.

Donets also may refer to:

 Donets, Ukraine, formerly Chervonyi Donets, an urban-type settlement in Ukraine
 Donets Basin (Donbas or Donbass)
 Donets Kryvyi Rih Soviet Republic, a former breakaway Soviet republic of the October Revolution
 Donets Ridge
 Battle of the Donets (disambiguation)
 Dnieper–Donets culture

People
 Andriy Donets' (born 1981), Ukrainian soccer player
 Irina Donets (born 1976), Dutch volleyball player
 Natalia Donets (born 1957), Ukrainian politician
 Stanislav Donets (born 1983), Russian swimmer
 Tetiana Donets (born 1980), Ukrainian politician

See also
 Donetsk (disambiguation)
 Donetz (disambiguation)